White Cloud conveyed Confederate provisions in the Mississippi. She was captured on 13 February 1863 near Island No. 10 by USS New Era who sent her prize to Cairo, Ill., for adjudication. Acquired by the Union Navy, she served the North under the same name and in a similar capacity for the remainder of the war.

Notes 

 
Ships of the Confederate States Navy

References